Pseudocolaspis pedestris is a species of leaf beetle of the Democratic Republic of the Congo, described by Édouard Lefèvre in 1884.

References

Eumolpinae
Beetles of the Democratic Republic of the Congo
Beetles described in 1884
Taxa named by Édouard Lefèvre
Endemic fauna of the Democratic Republic of the Congo